Luther Henry Caldwell House is a historic home located at Lumberton, Robeson County, North Carolina.  It was built between 1893 and 1903, and is a large two-story, eclectic Queen Anne style frame dwelling.  It features a double tier wraparound porch with an octagonal pavilion and decorative woodwork on the porches, bayed gable end projections, and gable fronts.  It was the home of Luther Henry Caldwell, an important business and social leader in Lumberton.

It was added to the National Register of Historic Places in 1978.

References

Houses on the National Register of Historic Places in North Carolina
Queen Anne architecture in North Carolina
Houses completed in 1903
Houses in Robeson County, North Carolina
National Register of Historic Places in Robeson County, North Carolina